Adam Stafford (born 24 February 1982) is a Scottish musician, filmmaker, film writer, photographer and broadcaster based in Falkirk, Scotland. He was the lead singer and songwriter with the Scottish band Y'all is Fantasy Island as well as a short film maker and solo artist. Stafford was born in Sunderland, England. In the late 1980s, his family moved to Falkirk, where he still resides.

Music
Having released music as Y'all is Fantasy Island since 2005 as a solo project, Stafford added various members to augment his alternative folk sound. After independently releasing four albums – In Faceless Towns Forever (2006), Rescue Weekend, No Ceremony and Infanticidal Genuflector (all in 2008) – the group announced that they would be splitting up in March 2010.

Stafford has released a number of solo albums including Awnings (2009), Miniature Porcelain Horse Emporium (2010) and mini album Music in the Mirabel (2010) which is a collection of covers and re-workings with tracks ranging from Daniel Johnston to Austrian Poet Georg Trakl. On these releases, Stafford experiments with vocal looping and textural soundscapes. He was quoted as saying "I'd been experimenting with looping and layering vocals before – inspired, primarily, by Steve Reich's vocal arrangements on Music For 18 Musicians and Edinburgh artist Wounded Knee".

In August 2011, Stafford issued the album, Build a Harbour Immediately which was produced by Paul Savage in Chem19 Studios in Hamilton. The LP was released to great acclaim in Scotland and made many end-of-year polls within the online blogging community. The album blended what Stafford had been experimenting with thus far: atmospheric acoustic folk and a capela experimentalism with an unusual sway for melodic, hook-laden pop choruses.

In April 2012, Stafford issued a split 7-inch single with Phantom Band singer Rick Redbeard entitled "Now We're Dancing" / "Vanishing Tanks" on Gerry Loves Records and, in August, he produced (as well as contributing to) an EP cassette with the Falkirk outfit, Sweethearts of The Prison Rodeo, entitled "Welcome" / "Vessels Shifted". Stafford's side consisted of four minimal guitar instrumentals written for film.

In 2013, Stafford announced that he was releasing his new LP Imaginary Walls Collapse via Song, by Toad Records and Kingfisher Bluez in North America. The LP was released on 20 July 2013 on 12″ vinyl and download. The set included contributions from Stafford regular (engineer and co-producer) Robbie Lesiuk, Siobhan Wilson, Anna Miles (Maple Leaves), Matt Brennan (Zoey Van Goey) and Ben Hillman (Over The Wall) and displayed a more propulsive, electric sound reflective of Stafford's intense live performances. The album featured heavily on many end-of-year lists in the UK music press/blogs in 2013 (Stafford was listed as number 51 in The List magazine's Hot 100 top cultural practitioners in Scotland). In March 2014, Imaginary Walls Collapse was long-listed for a Scottish Album of The Year Award, hosted by the Scottish Music Industry Association.

Stafford also composed and performed original music for Alan Bissett's one-man show, What The Falkirk, which was commissioned by Falkirk Community Trust as part of their Creative Place Awards grant. The show took a humorous and bitter-sweet look at Falkirk history and life and toured the Greater Falkirk area in June 2015. The shows received positive reviews from the press, with Joyce McMillan in a review for The Scotsman, noting that Stafford's music was "Powerful".

In March 2016, Edinburgh record label Song, by Toad issued Stafford's sixth solo album, Taser Revelations, on CD, white 12-inch vinyl and download. The album was recorded in the label's newly acquired warehouse space, The Happiness Hotel in Leith, Edinburgh, over four days in July 2014 and two days in October 2014. It was produced and engineered by regular collaborator Robbie Lesiuk, who used the warehouse's natural reverb in the large room, and also played a plethora of instruments including steel drums, bass, organ and mellotron. Other collaborators included Greggor Douglas who improvised synthesizer parts on a vintage Roland Juno and Omnichord and Anna Miles who provided vocal harmonies on three tracks. The album was completed at the end of 2014 but was postponed during the following year due to commitments with family and other projects.

The album was released to almost unanimous acclaim from the online and print music press. Clash magazine commented, "(Stafford is) A songwriter of real depth, rich in understanding, in melodic virtuosity, his work has gradually built up into an imposing, heroic catalogue". Gigsoup wrote in their 4.5/5 review, "Scotland's gifted musician and lyrical genius does well to keep you engaged throughout the entire album. Each song is so distinct, all with the classic Stafford strong loops that demand your attention without overpowering the song itself". While Alan Morrison writing for The National noted, "Yet again, Adam Stafford has created one of the best albums of the year".

In 2017, Stafford issued a collection of photography as a dual photobook and album entitled Reverse Drift. The photobook was a selection of mainly landscape and abstract photos that Stafford had been taking since 1999. The musical element was a download of a single 40-minute track improvised in one single take that incorporated a capela ambience, sampled drums and clarinet and synthesizers.

In October 2017, Stafford and Lesiuk began work on another musical project that was to become the album Fire Behind the Curtain. Released on 4 May 2018 via Song by Toad Records, the largely instrumental, classically-leaning set was met with perhaps the greatest acclaim of Stafford's career. Working with The Pumpkinseeds and Modern Studies cellist and arranger Pete Harvey and a nine-piece choir, the album referenced Stafford's struggles with depression that had plagued him since youth. The record was issued on double-disc 12-inch gatefold vinyl and received ecstatic reviews from critics: in a 9/10 review, God is in The TV said the LP "may stand as perhaps the most stunning piece of art to have been released so far on Song by Toad”; a 5/5 review The Skinny magazine called the album “a rich and haunting record of intelligence, beauty, depth and darkness – it’s a monumental piece of work”. Elsewhere The Scotsman 's 4/5 review noted that "it's worth surrendering to its shifting soundscapes" and BBC Radio 6 Music's Nemone on Electric Ladyland stated FBTC was “An absolute triumph of an album”.

Film
In 2009, Stafford directed the short film The Shutdown written by Scottish author and playwright Alan Bissett and produced by Peter Gerard. The film is the autobiographical story of Bissett's father who was badly injured during an industrial accident at the Petrochemical plant in Falkirk and about the effect that the incident had on his family. The film also explores Bissett's relationship with his hometown and the industry that surrounds it. Stafford shot the film in thirteen hours during one evening for around fifty pounds and used the local Petrochemical Plant's eerie and cinematic landscape for the film's striking visual aesthetic. The film went on to win the "Best Short Documentary" award at the San Francisco International Film Festival, "Best Short Documentary" at Palm Springs Film Festival, along with both the Jury and Audience prizes for Scottish Short Film at the Jim Poole Awards. At the end of 2010 the film also won "Best International Short Documentary" at The Belo Horizonte Film Festival in Brazil and Grand Jury prize for "Best European Short" at Festival Premier Plans in France in January 2011.

The Shutdown was nominated for a BAFTA Scotland "New Talent Award" in the Factual category for 2010, and was nominated for the "Scottish Short Documentary Award" at the Edinburgh International Film Festival. Stafford also composed the music for The Shutdown. The 23-minute track entitled "Hammer Eats Hoover" can also be found as the finale on Y'all is Fantasy Island's fourth album Infanticidal Genuflector (2008). The film has been selected in competition in excess of 30 International film festivals since 2009 and is the most successful British short film in terms of awards won, festivals attended and initial budget/return in the last decade.

In 2010, Stafford directed the promotional video for fellow Scottish act The Twilight Sad's single "Seven Years of Letters" from their second album Forget the Night Ahead. The video won Video of the Year 2011 at The Scottish New Music Awards

In 2013, Stafford completed his second short film, No Hope For Men Below, a poetic reinterpretation of The Redding Pit Disaster of Falkirk 1923, written in Broad Scots by local poet and author Janet Paisley. The film was mainly shot in a disused mine in Fife and on location in Wanlockhead and Falkirk. In February 2014, the film had its world premier at Glasgow Short Film Festival and was given a Special Mention by the Festival Jury, who stated: ‘No Hope For Men Below uses extraordinary sound design, stark imagery, and poetry to create a unique cinematic experience. This lyrical, expressionist retelling of the Redding Pit disaster of 1923 not only captures the poignancy of the literal event, but explores a multitude of wounds deep within the national psyche.' It went on to be selected for Encounters Short Film Festival in Bristol and Indie Cork Film Festival in Ireland at the end of 2014.

References

Living people
1982 births
21st-century Scottish male singers
Scottish songwriters
Scottish film directors
British male songwriters